Park Yong-woo (born 10 September 1993) is a South Korean professional footballer who plays as a midfielder for Ulsan Hyundai.

He became known for good performance in Round of 16 at 2015 AFC Champions League.

Career statistics

Honours

Club
Ulsan Hyundai
 K League 1: 2022

References

External links 
 
 Park Yong-woo – National Team Stats at KFA 

1993 births
Living people
Association football midfielders
South Korean footballers
FC Seoul players
Ulsan Hyundai FC players
K League 1 players
Footballers at the 2016 Summer Olympics
Olympic footballers of South Korea
Konkuk University alumni
Sportspeople from Gyeonggi Province
People from Goyang
Gimcheon Sangmu FC players